Haddow is a triangle-shaped residential neighbourhood in south west Edmonton, Alberta, Canada.  It is bounded on the south west by Anthony Henday Drive and on the south east by Terwillegar Drive.  The northern boundary is an undeveloped strip of land about 29 Avenue.

The neighbourhood is a newer neighbourhood with all residential construction taking place after 1995.  The most common type of housing is the single family home (78%), followed by apartment style condominiums in high rise buildings with five or more stories (11%).  Duplexes make up 6% of the residences and row houses the remaining 4%. All residences are owner occupied.

Demographics 

Recreation 

Haddow Park is located near the centre of the neighbourhood.  The park features perimeter and bisecting asphalt walking trails, a playground, sports fields, toboggan hill, and (in the winter months) an ice rink.  Haddow Park is a designated on-leash area for dogs.

Trails located at the north-western boundary of Haddow provide access to the North Saskatchewan River valley and Terwillegar Park.

Surrounding neighbourhoods 
Surrounding neighbourhoods are Henderson Estates and Falconer Heights to the north, Carter Crest to the north east, Leger and Terwillegar Towne to the east, and Terwillegar South to the south east.  Beyond Anthony Henday Drive are the neighbourhoods of Ambleside and Windermere Estates

References

External links 
 Haddow Neighbourhood Profile

Neighbourhoods in Edmonton